Qarah Qayah is a village in Qeshlaq Rural District of Abish Ahmad District, Kaleybar County, East Azerbaijan province, Iran. At the 2006 National Census, its population was 649 in 137 households. The following census in 2011 counted 719 people in 167 households. The latest census in 2016 showed a population of 714 people in 208 households; it was the largest village in its rural district.

References 

Kaleybar County

Populated places in East Azerbaijan Province

Populated places in Kaleybar County